In mathematics, specifically in abstract algebra, power associativity is a property of a binary operation that is a weak form of associativity.

Definition 
An algebra (or more generally a magma) is said to be power-associative if the subalgebra generated by any element is associative. Concretely, this means that if an element  is performed an operation  by itself several times, it doesn't matter in which order the operations are carried out, so for instance .

Examples and properties 
Every associative algebra is power-associative, but so are all other alternative algebras (like the octonions, which are non-associative) and even some non-alternative algebras like the sedenions and Okubo algebras.  Any algebra whose elements are idempotent is also power-associative.

Exponentiation to the power of any positive integer can be defined consistently whenever multiplication is power-associative. For example, there is no need to distinguish whether x3 should be defined as (xx)x or as x(xx), since these are equal. Exponentiation to the power of zero can also be defined if the operation has an identity element, so the existence of identity elements is useful in power-associative contexts.

Over an infinite field of prime characteristic  there is no finite set of identities that characterizes power-associativity, but there are infinite independent sets, as described by Gainov (1970):

A substitution law holds for real power-associative algebras with unit, which basically asserts that multiplication of polynomials works as expected. For f a real polynomial in x, and for any a in such an algebra define f(a) to be the element of the algebra resulting from the obvious substitution of a into f. Then for any two such polynomials f and g, we have that .

See also
Alternativity

References

 

 

Non-associative algebra
Properties of binary operations